Naked is Amber's third studio album released in 2002 on Tommy Boy Records. It features mostly pop songs but very few dance songs unlike her previous albums. The singles include "Yes!", "The Need to Be Naked" and "Anyway (Men Are from Mars)". The album also includes a "The Need to Be Naked" remix by Thunderpuss but this remix was not available on all copies. The lyrics to the first song "Yes!" are based on Molly Bloom's soliloquy in James Joyce's novel Ulysses.

Track listing

References

2002 albums
Amber (singer) albums
Tommy Boy Records albums